Eric Ulyssee Frampton (born February 6, 1984) is a former American football  safety in the National Football League (NFL) for the Detroit Lions, Minnesota Vikings, Dallas Cowboys, and New Orleans Saints. He was drafted by the Oakland Raiders in the fifth round of the 2007 NFL Draft. He played college football at Washington State.

Early years

Frampton attended Oak Grove High School in San Jose, California, where he was an All-league selection as a junior, after rushing for 17 touchdowns. As a senior, he missed 5 games with a broken collar bone and had 30 tackles in the remaining 6 contests.

He accepted a football scholarship from Washington State University. As a redshirt freshman, he played mainly on special teams, registering 8 defensive tackles in 12 games. 

As a sophomore, he appeared in 11 games, making 24 tackles and 3 pass breakups. He received the Washington State Ironman Award in 2004.

As a junior, he became a starter at safety, registering  87 tackles (led the team), one sack, 5.5 tackles for loss, one quarterback pressure, one forced fumble, one fumble recovery, 8 pass deflections and returned one interception for a 36-yard touchdown. He made 13 tackles against USC and Arizona State University.

As a senior, he was the Cougars' leading tackler (100) and played both the free and strong safety position. He also tallied 4 tackles for loss, one sack  13 pass breakups (led the team), 2 forced fumbles and 5 interceptions (led the team) with one returned for a touchdown. He made 11 tackles against USC and 16 against the University of Oregon.  

He finished his college career with 23-of-46 starts, 219 tackles (9.5 for loss), 6 interceptions, 2 sacks, 2 quarterback pressures and 2 touchdowns.

Professional career

Frampton was timed at 4.61 seconds in the 40-yard dash at the 2007 NFL Scouting Combine, but improved it to 4.51 in the 40 at his College Pro Day.

Oakland Raiders
He was selected by the Oakland Raiders in the fifth round of the 2007 NFL Draft. He was waived before the season started on September 1, 2007.

Detroit Lions
On September 2, 2007, the Detroit Lions claimed him off waivers. He played in 5 games and had 7 special teams tackles. He was released on October 21.

Minnesota Vikings
On October 22, 2007, the Minnesota Vikings claimed him off waivers and became a special teams' standout with 14 tackles (fourth on the team). In 2008, he was second on the team with 21 special teams tackles. In 2009, he was fourth on the team with 18 special teams tackles. In 2010, he was third on the team with 10 special teams tackles.

In 2011, he was voted the Vikings' Special Teams MVP by his teammates, after leading the team with a career-best 22 tackles. On August 31, 2012, he was released before the season started.

Dallas Cowboys
On September 25, 2012, Frampton was signed by the Dallas Cowboys to add depth to a defense depleted by injuries.   Although he played in only 13 games, he led the team in special teams tackles (21) and was used in the team's defensive sub-packages, before being named the starter at strong safety for the last 2 games of the season. He finished the year with a career-high 21 tackles, 3 pass breakups and 2 starts on defense. He also had 25 special teams tackles (led the team), 2 passes defensed and one fumble recovery.

He was re-signed on June 4, 2013. He injured his groin during training camp and was placed on the injured reserve list on September 3. He was released with an injury settlement on September 9.

New Orleans Saints
On December 17, 2013, he was signed as a 2013 by the 2013, reuniting with Rob Ryan who was his defensive coordinator with the Cowboys. The Saints assigned him uniform number 37, previously worn by Saints special teams star Steve Gleason, who also attended Washington State. On January 1, 2014, he was released to make room for linebacker Kyle Knox.

References

External links
Washington State bio

1984 births
Living people
American football safeties
Washington State Cougars football players
Oakland Raiders players
Detroit Lions players
Minnesota Vikings players
Dallas Cowboys players
New Orleans Saints players
Players of American football from San Jose, California